This is a list of North Korean television programmes or series. For North Korean multi-part films and film series see list of North Korean films.

List

See also

List of North Korean actors
List of North Korean films
List of North Korean operas
Television in North Korea
Welcome to Pyongyang Animal Park, a film that was made originally as a two episode television series

References

Works cited

North Korea
Series
Television